John Sheppard may refer to:

 John Sheppard (composer) (–1558), English singer and composer
 John Sheppard (writer) (1785–1879), English lay religious author
 John Sheppard (VC) (1817–1884), English recipient of the Victoria Cross, 1855
 John Sheppard (cricketer) (1824–1882), English cricketer
 John Augustine Sheppard (1849–1925), Irish American clergyman
 John Calhoun Sheppard (1850–1931), governor of South Carolina, 1886
 John Levi Sheppard (1852–1902), American lawyer, judge, and legislator, U.S. Representative for Texas
 John Morris Sheppard (1875–1941), U.S. Representative and Senator for Texas
 Sir John Tresidder Sheppard (1881–1968), British classicist
 Johnny Sheppard (1902–1969), Canadian ice hockey forward
 John Sheppard (car designer) (1922–2015), British car designer
 John Sheppard (Australian politician) (born 1952), Australian politician
 John Sheppard, member of English band Acoustic Alchemy
 John Sheppard (baseball), American professional baseball player in 1873
 John Sheppard (British Army soldier) (1915–2015)
 John Albert Sheppard (1875–?), educator, farmer and political figure in Saskatchewan
 John Sheppard (North Carolina), Revolutionary War soldier and commander of the North Carolina militia

Fiction 
 John Sheppard (Stargate), fictional character from Stargate Atlantis

See also
 John Shepard III (1886–1950), American radio executive and merchant, owner of the Shepard Department Store in Boston, MA
 Jack Sheppard (1702–1724), English criminal
 Jack Sheppard (cave diver) (1909–2001), cave diving pioneer in the United Kingdom
 Commander Shepard, playable character from Mass Effect; default name is John Shepard
 John Shepherd (disambiguation)